Isao Kataoka (12 July 1936 – 9 December 2015) was a Japanese ice hockey administrator. He served as the executive director and the vice-president of the Japan Ice Hockey Federation and was president of the Hokkaido Ice Hockey Federation. He worked with the International Ice Hockey Federation (IIHF) in the planning and hosting of its tournaments in Japan, including the 1972 Winter Olympics and the 1998 Winter Olympics. He received the Paul Loicq Award in 2001 for contributions to the IIHF and promoting international ice hockey.

Early life
Kataoka was born 12 July 1936 in Hokkaido. He attended Chuo University in Tokyo.

Career
Kataoka embarked on a career in ice hockey after graduating university and made Sapporo his hometown. His various administrative roles included serving as the executive director and the vice-president of the Japan Ice Hockey Federation and as president of the Hokkaido Ice Hockey Federation. He played an integral role in the planning and execution of International Ice Hockey Federation (IIHF) tournaments hosted in Japan. During his time with the Japan Ice Hockey Federation, the country hosted the 1972 Winter Olympics in Sapporo and the 1998 Winter Olympics in Nagano. 

The IIHF credited Kataoka's "experience and knowledge of the game of ice hockey" for his effective management of these events, as well as his attention to detail in preparing facilities for the participants. The IIHF further stated that "Kataoka's enthusiasm and aspiring attitude in the development of ice hockey administrators and officials of the next generation was greatly appreciated and respected by the ice hockey family in and outside of Japan".

In 2001 Kataoka received the Paul Loicq Award for contributions to the IIHF and promoting international ice hockey. He became the first Japanese person to receive the award, and the only Japanese recipient as of 2019. He remained involved with Japanese international sports and served as the head of mission for the Japanese delegation at the 2005 Winter Universiade at Innsbruck.

Later life
Kataoka served as an advisor to the Japanese Ice Hockey Federation. After the 2011 Tōhoku earthquake and tsunami devastated areas in the Sendai region of Japan, he was part of the ceremonies to remember the disaster. Donations were collected during the 2012 Japan ice hockey championships, and he presented the funds raised to the Sendai Lady Rabbits team.

Kataoka died on 9 December 2015 at age 79.

References

1936 births
2015 deaths
Chuo University alumni
International Ice Hockey Federation executives
Japanese ice hockey administrators
Paul Loicq Award recipients
Sportspeople from Sapporo